The Akaiwang River is a tributary of the Wenamu River in the Cuyuni-Mazaruni region of Guyana.

The river features the Akaiwang Falls. Located at 6' 40' W 59' 42'. The falls are also known as the Wakupang or Akaiwong Cataracts.

Akaiwang River is also a gold mining operation. The surrounding forest area was licensed for balata bleeding.

See also
List of rivers of Guyana

References

Bibliography 
 Rand McNally, The New International Atlas, 1993.

Rivers of Guyana